The Europe/Africa Zone was one of the three zones of the regional Davis Cup competition in 1998.

In the Europe/Africa Zone there were four different tiers, called groups, in which teams competed against each other to advance to the upper tier. The top two teams in Group III advanced to the Europe/Africa Zone Group II in 1999, whereas the bottom two teams were relegated to the Europe/Africa Zone Group IV in 1999.

Participating nations

Draw
 Venue: Amicale Tennis Association, Lomé, Togo
 Date: 21–25 January

Group A

Group B

1st to 4th place play-offs

5th to 8th place play-offs

Final standings

  and  promoted to Group II in 1999.
  and  relegated to Group IV in 1999.

Round robin

Group A

Cyprus vs. Estonia

Ghana vs. Madagascar

Cyprus vs. Ghana

Estonia vs. Madagascar

Cyprus vs. Madagascar

Estonia vs. Ghana

Group B

Togo vs. Bosnia and Herzegovina

Greece vs. Kenya

Togo vs. Greece

Bosnia and Herzegovina vs. Kenya

Togo vs. Kenya

Bosnia and Herzegovina vs. Greece

1st to 4th place play-offs

Semifinals

Greece vs. Estonia

Togo vs. Ghana

Final

Togo vs. Greece

3rd to 4th play-off

Ghana vs. Estonia

5th to 8th place play-offs

5th to 8th play-offs

Kenya vs. Cyprus

Bosnia and Herzegovina vs. Madagascar

5th to 6th play-off

Bosnia and Herzegovina vs. Kenya

7th to 8th play-off

Madagascar vs. Cyprus

References

External links
Davis Cup official website

Davis Cup Europe/Africa Zone
Europe Africa Zone Group III